The Commonwealth Heads of Government Meeting  (CHOGM;  or) is a biennial summit meeting of the governmental leaders from all Commonwealth nations. Despite the name, the head of state may be present in the meeting instead of the head of government, especially among semi-presidential states. Every two years the meeting is held in a different member state and is chaired by that nation's respective prime minister or president, who becomes the Commonwealth Chair-in-Office until the next meeting. Queen Elizabeth II, who was the Head of the Commonwealth, attended every CHOGM beginning with Ottawa in 1973 until Perth in 2011, although her formal participation only began in 1997. She was represented by the Prince of Wales at the 2013 meeting as the 87-year-old monarch was curtailing long-distance travel. The Queen attended the 2015 summit in Malta and the 2018 summit (delayed by one year) in London, but was represented again by the Prince of Wales at the 2022 meeting (delayed by two years) in Rwanda.

The first CHOGM was held in 1971 in Singapore and there have been 26 held in total: the most recent was held in Kigali, Rwanda. They are held once every two years, although this pattern has occasionally been interrupted. They are held around the Commonwealth, rotating by invitation amongst its members.

In the past, CHOGMs have attempted to orchestrate common policies on certain contentious issues and current events, with a special focus on issues affecting member nations. CHOGMs have discussed the continuation of apartheid rule in South Africa and how to end it, military coups in Pakistan and Fiji, and allegations of electoral fraud in Zimbabwe. Sometimes the member states agree on a common idea or solution and release a joint statement declaring their opinion. More recently, beginning at the 1997 CHOGM, the meeting has had an official theme, set by the host nation, on which the primary discussions have been focused.

History

The meetings originated with the leaders of the self-governing colonies of the British Empire. The First Colonial Conference in 1887 was followed by periodic meetings, known as Imperial Conferences from 1907, of government leaders of the Empire.  The development of the independence of the dominions, and the creation of a number of new dominions, as well as the invitation of Southern Rhodesia (which also attended as a sui generis colony), changed the nature of the meetings. As the dominion leaders asserted themselves more and more at the meetings, it became clear that the time for 'imperial' conferences was over.

From the ashes of the Second World War, seventeen Commonwealth Prime Ministers' Conferences were held between 1944 and 1969.  Of these, sixteen were held in London, reflecting then-prevailing views of the Commonwealth as the continuation of the Empire and the centralisation of power in the British Commonwealth Office (the one meeting outside London, in Lagos, was an extraordinary meeting held in January 1966 to co-ordinate policies towards Rhodesia).  Two supplementary meetings were also held during this period: a Commonwealth Statesmen's meeting to discuss peace terms in April 1945, and a Commonwealth Economic Conference in 1952.

The 1960s saw an overhaul of the Commonwealth.  The swift expansion of the Commonwealth after decolonisation saw the newly independent countries demand the creation of the Commonwealth Secretariat, and the United Kingdom, in response, successfully founding the Commonwealth Foundation. This decentralisation of power demanded a reformulation of the meetings.  Instead of the meetings always being held in London, they would rotate across the membership, subject to countries' ability to host the meetings: beginning with Singapore in 1971.  They were also renamed the 'Commonwealth Heads of Government Meetings' to reflect the growing diversity of the constitutional structures in the Commonwealth.

Structure

The core of the CHOGM are the executive sessions, which are the formal gatherings of the heads of government to do business. However, the majority of the important decisions are held not in the main meetings themselves, but at the informal 'retreats': introduced at the second CHOGM, in Ottawa, by Prime Minister of Canada Pierre Trudeau, but reminiscent of the excursions to Chequers or Dorneywood in the days of the Prime Ministers' Conferences. Only the head of the delegation and their spouse and one additional person attend the retreats. The additional person may be of any capacity (personal, political, security, etc.) but only has occasional and intermittent access to the head of the delegation. It is usually at the retreat where, isolated from their advisers, the heads resolve the most intransigent issues: leading to the Gleneagles Agreement in 1977, the Lusaka Declaration in 1979, the Langkawi Declaration in 1989, the Millbrook Programme in 1995, the Aso Rock Declaration in 2003, and the Colombo Declaration on Sustainable, Inclusive and Equitable Development in 2013.

The 'fringe' of civil society organisations, including the Commonwealth Family and local groups, adds a cultural dimension to the event, and brings the CHOGM a higher media profile and greater acceptance by the local population. First officially recognised at Limassol in 1993, these events, spanning a longer period than the meeting itself, have, to an extent, preserved the length of the CHOGM: but only in the cultural sphere. Other meetings, such as those of the Commonwealth Ministerial Action Group, Commonwealth Business Council, and respective foreign ministers, have also dealt with business away from the heads of government themselves.

As the scope of the CHOGM has expanded beyond the meetings of the heads of governments themselves, the CHOGMs have become progressively shorter, and their business compacted into less time. The 1971 CHOGM lasted for nine days, and the 1977 and 1991 CHOGMs for seven days each.  However, Harare's epochal CHOGM was the last to last a week; the 1993 CHOGM lasted for five days, and the contentious 1995 CHOGM for only three-and-a-half. The 2005 and subsequent conferences were held over two to two-and-a-half-days. However, recent CHOGMs have also featured several days of pre-summit Commonwealth Forums on business, women, youth, as well as the Commonwealth People's Forum and meetings of foreign ministers.

Issues 

During the 1980s, CHOGMs were dominated by calls for the Commonwealth to impose sanctions on South Africa to pressure the country to end apartheid. The division between Britain, during the government of Margaret Thatcher which resisted the call for sanctions and African Commonwealth countries, and the rest of the Commonwealth was intense at times and led to speculation that the organisation might collapse.  According to one of Margaret Thatcher's former aides, Mrs. Thatcher, very privately, used to say that CHOGM stood for "Compulsory Handouts to Greedy Mendicants." According to his daughter, Denis Thatcher also referred to CHOGM as standing for 'Coons Holidaying on Government Money'.

In 2011, British Prime Minister David Cameron informed the British House of Commons that his proposals to reform the rules governing royal succession, a change which would require the approval of all sixteen Commonwealth realms, was approved at the 28–30 October CHOGM in Perth, subsequently referred to as the Perth Agreement.

Rwanda joined the Commonwealth in 2009 despite the Commonwealth Human Rights Initiative's (CHRI) finding that "the state of governance and human rights in Rwanda does not satisfy Commonwealth standards", and that it "does not therefore qualify for admission". Both the CHRI and Human Rights Watch have found that respect for democracy and human rights in Rwanda has declined since the country joined the Commonwealth. There have been calls for the Commonwealth to stand up for democracy and human rights in Rwanda at the 2022 CHOGM.

Agenda
Under the Millbrook Commonwealth Action Programme, each CHOGM is responsible for renewing the remit of the Commonwealth Ministerial Action Group, whose responsibility it is to uphold the Harare Declaration on the core political principles of the Commonwealth.

Incidents
A bomb exploded at the Sydney Hilton Hotel, the venue for the February 1978 Commonwealth Heads of Government Regional Meeting. Twelve foreign heads of government were staying in the hotel at the time. Most delegates were evacuated by Royal Australian Air Force helicopters and the meeting was moved to Bowral, protected by 800 soldiers of the Australian Army.

As the convocation of heads of governments and permanent Commonwealth staff and experts, CHOGMs are the highest institution of action in the Commonwealth, and rare occasions on which Commonwealth leaders all come together.  CHOGMs have been the venues of many of the Commonwealth's most dramatic events.  Robert Mugabe announced Zimbabwe's immediate withdrawal from the Commonwealth at the 2003 CHOGM, and Nigeria's execution of Ken Saro-Wiwa and eight others on the first day of the 1995 CHOGM led to that country's suspension.

It has also been the trigger of a number of events that have shaken participating countries domestically.  The departure of Uganda's President Milton Obote to the 1971 CHOGM allowed Idi Amin to overthrow Obote's government.  Similarly, President James Mancham's attendance of the 1977 CHOGM gave Prime Minister France-Albert René the opportunity to seize power in the Seychelles.

List of meetings

The 25th CHOGM was originally scheduled for Vanuatu in 2017 but the country rescinded its offer to host after Cyclone Pam devastated the country's infrastructure in March 2015. The meeting was rescheduled for the United Kingdom in the spring of 2018 which also resulted in the 26th CHOGM, originally scheduled for 2019, to be rescheduled for 22–27 June 2020. However, due to the coronavirus pandemic, the 26th CHOGM was again postponed to 2022.

Notes

References

External links 
 Commonwealth Heads of Government Meeting page on the Commonwealth Secretariat web site
 Kampala' 2007, CHOGM 2007 Official page
 CHOGM count Down, CHOGM News
 CHOGM 2007, CHOGM 2007 Kampala Uganda, Updates and information
 CHOGM 2007 Highlights & News, CHOGM 2007 Highlights
 CHOGM 2011, Australian Government
 CHOGM 2013, CHOGM 2013 Official website